A continuous truss bridge is a truss bridge which extends without hinges or joints across three or more supports.  A continuous truss bridge may use less material than a series of simple trusses because a continuous truss distributes live loads across all the spans; in a series of simple trusses, each truss must be capable of supporting the entire load.

Although some continuous truss bridges resemble cantilever bridges and may be constructed using cantilever techniques, there are important differences between the two forms.  Cantilever bridges need not connect rigidly mid-span, as the cantilever arms are self-supporting.  Although some cantilever bridges appear continuous due to decorative trusswork at the joints, these bridges will remain standing if the connections between the cantilevers are broken, or if the suspended span (if any) is removed.  Conversely, continuous truss bridges rely on rigid truss connections throughout the structure for stability.  Severing a continuous truss mid-span endangers the structure.  However, continuous truss bridges do not experience the tipping forces that a cantilever bridge must resist, because the main span of a continuous truss bridge is supported at both ends.

It is possible to convert a series of simple truss spans into a continuous truss.  For example, the northern approach to the Golden Gate Bridge was originally constructed as a series of five simple truss spans.  In 2001, a seismic retrofit project connected the five spans into a single continuous truss bridge.

History

Continuous truss bridges started to be constructed in Europe during the second half of the 19th century. Although the advantages of continuous bridges were known, there were three main engineering challenges which slowed their widespread adoption:

Continuous trusses are statically indeterminate, which made it very laborious to calculate the stresses in the bridge before computers became available.
The stresses in the truss can change significantly if one of the supports settles more than the others.
The truss is susceptible to significant stresses due to temperature gradients in the structure, such as if the upper part of the truss is in the sun and the lower part is in the shade.

However, it was possible to avoid these issues to a certain extent through careful design. The early European bridges were usually lattice trusses with three to five spans. An example was the Boyne Viaduct, built in 1855 in Drogheda, Ireland. The first continuous truss bridge in North America was the Lachine Bridge in Montreal, built in 1888, followed by the Sciotoville Bridge in 1916 and the Bessemer & Lake Erie Railroad Bridge in 1918.

Since the development of computer-aided engineering, continuous truss bridges have become more common.

Examples

Some notable continuous truss bridges, with main span lengths :

Ikitsuki Bridge, 
Astoria-Megler Bridge, 
Francis Scott Key Bridge, 
Taylor-Southgate Bridge, 
Julien Dubuque Bridge, 
Charles M. Braga Jr. Memorial Bridge, 
Governor Harry W. Nice Memorial Bridge, 
Don N. Holt Bridge, 
Sciotoville Bridge, 
Owensboro Bridge, 
Carroll C. Cropper Bridge, 
Sewickley Bridge, 
Betsy Ross Bridge, 
Chesapeake Bay Bridge, secondary spans
Cape Girardeau Bridge,  (replaced in 2003 and subsequently demolished)
Champlain Bridge,  (replaced in 2009 subsequently demolished)
Kingston–Rhinecliff Bridge, 7,793 feet (2357 m)

See also
 List of longest continuous truss bridge spans

References

External links
Golden Gate Bridge retrofit

 
Truss bridges by type